Tupper Lake, New York  may refer to:

 Tupper Lake (New York), lake in the Adirondack Park
 Tupper Lake (village), New York
 Tupper Lake (town), New York